Carlito Guancing Galvez Jr. (born December 12, 1962) is a retired Philippine Army general serving as the secretary of National Defense since 2023. He previously served as the Presidential Adviser on the Peace Process during the presidencies of Rodrigo Duterte and Bongbong Marcos from 2018 to 2022. He also served as the Chief Implementer of the Philippines' Declared National Policy Against COVID-19 (COVID-19 National Task Force). In November 2020, he was appointed as the country's COVID-19 vaccine czar, and was responsible for leading the government's efforts in bringing into the country about 245.23 million doses of COVID-19 vaccines as of May 2022 beginning in 2021 despite the global vaccine shortage. Prior to this, he also previously served as the 50th Chief of Staff of the Armed Forces of the Philippines from April to December 2018.

Education
A member of the PMA Sandiwa class of 1985, Galvez was also trained in airborne, intelligence, and special operations, particularly in the 1st Scout Ranger Regiment. Galvez received his master's degree in Project Management in the University of New South Wales, Australia, and took the Executive Education program in Harvard University, in Massachusetts. Galvez also has a specialty on Humanitarian Assistance, Strategic Management, and Peace-building Negotiations.

Galvez also attended the Asian Institute of Management Center for Bridging Leadership, the Infantry Officer Advance Course in Fort Benning, Georgia, the Military Operation Research Symposium in Singapore, the Crisis Management Course in Hawaii, the Counter-terrorism Conference in the National Defense University, in Washington, D.C., the Rules of Engagement in Sanremo, Italy and the AFP Command and Staff College Class 47, where he served as Class President and Valedictorian.

Military career

After graduating at the Philippine Military Academy in 1985, then-Lieutenant Galvez, along with then-Lieutenant Rolando Joselito Bautista and other AFP troops became a part of the Reform the Armed Forces Movement (RAM), under the leadership then-Colonel Gregorio Honasan, and participated in the failed coup attempt against President Corazon Aquino. Galvez and his coup co-conspirators were detained before being granted amnesty in 1996 by Aquino's successor, President Fidel Ramos. Throughout the 1990s, he spent most of his career in Mindanao, particularly in the islands of Basilan and Sulu, and commanded multiple units and commands in the Philippine Army and the AFP, including the 1st Scout Ranger Battalion, where his unit was named the "best scout ranger battalion" in 2 consecutive years (2000 and 2001) and the Task Group Panther Bravo of the 1st Scout Ranger Regiment.

General Galvez also served as commander of the 104th Brigade, and became the deputy chief of staff for operations, organization & training, J3. Galvez also made successful efforts on the peace process with the Moro Islamic Liberation Front in 2015 as co-chairman on the Government of the Philippines Coordinating Committees on the Cessation of Hostilities (GPH-CCCH), and afterwards, commanded the 6th Infantry Division. Galvez also led units during the Zamboanga City crisis, where he commanded infantry units and launched defense operations within the city of Lamitan in Basilan, after the city's surroundings were occupied from an attack of the Abu Sayyaf group and its allies. Galvez's units successfully defended the city from the terrorists in the aftermath of the group's two-day offensive from September 12 to 14, 2013.

Commander, AFP Western Mindanao Command
In January 2017, then-Lieutenant General Galvez began his tenure as the commander of the commander of the AFP Western Mindanao Command. During his term as the region's top commander, Galvez expanded his peace operations within the Autonomous Region in Muslim Mindanao (ARMM). Galvez became more known for his leadership throughout the campaign to liberate the city the Battle of Marawi, where he launched an all-out offensive to retake the city from the  Maute and Abu Sayyaf terrorist groups, while secure the city's outskirt regions to prevent any terrorist reinforcements re-entering the city, and implemented safe zones with the assistance of the Moro Islamic Liberation Front.

In the aftermath of the Marawi Siege, Galvez also led numerous combat and neutralization operations against communists and Daesh-inspired groups, including Ben Salina Sapilin, a relative of Isnilon Hapilon, and intercepted numerous movements of terrorist groups, including piracy, in the region. Through his efforts on his diplomatic mentoring strategy in Western Mindanao, a total of 1,343 loose firearms were surrendered and recovered by the region's Joint Task Forces.

AFP Chief of Staff

Six months after the siege, Galvez was appointed as the Chief of Staff of the Armed Forces of the Philippines on April 18, 2018. As AFP Chief, he focused on ending the decades-long communist insurgency, while addressing the threat of terrorism and extremism, particularly in Mindanao. General Galvez also expanded his peace initiatives throughout the country, which led to the surrender of members of various communist fronts and terrorist groups, while providing assistance to law enforcement agencies such as the Philippine National Police, Philippine Drug Enforcement Agency and the National Bureau of Investigation in the fight against illegal drugs and criminality elements. Galvez also spearheaded the AFP modernization program, where he implemented shifts on the program as part of the lessons from the Marawi Siege, such as the procurement of high-caliber weapons for internal and external defense, and initiated updated doctrines on enhancing urban warfare and human rights. Galvez also led in promoting transparency and good governance within the AFP organization. Galvez ended his term as AFP Chief on December 11, 2018, where he was succeeded by his classmate, Gen. Benjamin Madrigal Jr..

Presidential Adviser on the Peace Process
On December 12, 2018, Galvez was appointed by President Rodrigo Duterte as Presidential Adviser on the Peace Process after the previous officeholder, Jesus Dureza, resigned amid a corruption scandal. He is a staunch advocate of the peace process with the Moro Front, and has been well received by many Bangsamoro stakeholders.

After President Duterte's term ended, Galvez remained presidential adviser under a "holdover capacity" until President Bongbong Marcos either appoints a new official or reappoints him to the post.

National Defense Secretary

On January 9, 2023, Galvez accepted the appointment as Secretary of National Defense by President Bongbong Marcos.

Awards

Left Side:

Right Side:

Badges and Other Awards:
  Legion of Merit (US Armed Forces)
  Combat Commander's Badge (Philippines)
  AFP Parachutist Badge 
  Scout Ranger Qualification Badge
  AFP Command & General Staff Course Badge
  PAF Gold Wings Badge
 AFP Leadership Award
 The Outstanding Philippine Soldiers in 2007
 United States Eisenhower Fellowships in 2006
 Gawad Dangal ng Lipi
 Department of Social Welfare and Development's (DSWD) “Salamat Po” Humanitarian Award 
 Outstanding Citizen of Taguig City Award
 Ateneo Peace Award

Personal life
Galvez is married to Marissa M. Pascua, an international flight purser of Philippine Airlines; they have a daughter, Mary Frances Therese.

References

|- 

|-

Living people
1962 births
Chairmen of the Joint Chiefs (Philippines)
Philippine Military Academy alumni
Bongbong Marcos administration cabinet members
Duterte administration personnel
Secretaries of National Defense of the Philippines
Recipients of the Order of Lakandula
Recipients of the Philippine Legion of Honor
Recipients of the Distinguished Service Star
Recipients of the Gold Cross (Philippines)
People from Bulacan
Recipients of the Philippine Republic Presidential Unit Citation
Recipients of the Legion of Merit
Recipients of the Outstanding Achievement Medal
Recipients of the Bronze Cross Medal
Recipients of the Military Merit Medal (Philippines)
Recipients of the Military Commendation Medal
Recipients of the Military Civic Action Medal